The 2005 WCHA Men's Ice Hockey Tournament was the 46th conference playoff in league history and 51st season where a WCHA champion was crowned. The 2005 tournament was played between March 11 and March 19, 2005, at five conference arenas and the Xcel Energy Center in St. Paul, Minnesota. By winning the tournament, Denver was awarded the Broadmoor Trophy and received the WCHA's automatic bid to the NCAA Tournament.

Format
The first round of the postseason tournament featured a best-of-three games format. All ten conference schools participated in the tournament with teams seeded No. 1 through No. 10 according to their final conference standing, with a tiebreaker system used to seed teams with an identical number of points accumulated. The top five seeded teams each earned home ice and hosted one of the lower seeded teams.

The winners of the first round series advanced to the Xcel Energy Center for the WCHA Final Five, the collective name for the quarterfinal, semifinal, and championship rounds. The Final Five uses a single-elimination format. Teams were re-seeded No. 1 through No. 5 according to the final regular season conference standings, with the top three teams automatically advancing to the semifinals.

Conference standings
Note: PTS = Points; GP = Games played; W = Wins; L = Losses; T = Ties; GF = Goals For; GA = Goals Against

Bracket
Teams are reseeded after the first round

Note: * denotes overtime period(s)

First round

(1) Denver vs. (10) Michigan Tech

(2) Colorado College vs. (9) St. Cloud State

(3) Minnesota vs. (8) Minnesota State

(4) Wisconsin vs. (7) Alaska-Anchorage

(5) North Dakota vs. (6) Minnesota-Duluth

Quarterfinal

(4) Wisconsin vs. (5) North Dakota

Semifinals

(1) Denver vs. (8) North Dakota

(2) Colorado College vs. (3) Minnesota

Third Place

(3) Minnesota vs. (5) North Dakota

Championship

(1) Denver vs. (2) Colorado College

Tournament awards

All-Tournament Team
F Rastislav Špirko (North Dakota)
F Brett Sterling* (Colorado College)
F Gabe Gauthier (Denver)
D Nick Fuher (North Dakota)
D Matt Laasch (Denver)
G Curtis McElhinney (Colorado College)
* Most Valuable Player(s)

See also
Western Collegiate Hockey Association men's champions

References

External links
WCHA official site 
2004–05 WCHA Standings
2004–05 NCAA Standings

WCHA Men's Ice Hockey Tournament
WCHA Men's Ice Hockey Tournament